Felix Chung Kwok-pan (born 4 November 1963) is a former member of the Legislative Council of Hong Kong for the Textiles and Garment constituency, representing the Liberal Party. He has also been the leader of the Liberal Party since 2016, after holding the position of chairman from 2014 to 2016.

Early career
He was born in 1963 to a garment business family who owns the Chungweiming Knitting Factory Limited. He was educated in Scotland, graduating from Robert Gordon University in Aberdeen with a bachelor's degree of science in 1986 and Stirling University with a degree of Master of Business Administration in 1988. He returned to Hong Kong in 1987 when he was 24 and joined a local surveying firm and later helped his father with his garment business of manufacturing wool knitwear and cotton knitted wear in 1988.

He later became the chairman of the Hong Kong Apparel Society and challenged as an independent for the Textiles and Garment functional constituency against a long-time incumbent Sophie Leung of the Liberal Party in the 2008 Legislative Council election. Chung received 711 votes, as compared to Leung's 1,255 votes, who soon fell out with the Liberals and left with two other legislators to form the Economic Synergy.

Legislative Councillor

He was invited by the Liberal Party honorary chairman James Tien to join the party in 2009. In the 2012 Legislative Council election, he challenged again in the same constituency against Henry Tan, CEO and president of Luen Thai Holdings, after Leung announced her retirement. He defeated Tan by 1,076 votes and took back the constituency for the Liberals. He became the vice-chairman after the election. When both James Tien and Selina Chow stepped down as party leader and chair, Chung was nominated to be the party vice-chairman on 1 December 2014.

He engaged in a debate with Chief Executive Leung Chun-ying over Leung's "appropriately proactive" economic policies on newspaper in 2015. He thought that Leung abandoning the "positive non-interventionism" for "appropriately proactive" policies was worrisome, in which the "visible hand" would "go beyond the line".

He retained his seat in the 2016 Legislative Council election by winning more than 75 percent of the votes. After the election, he succeeded the retiring Vincent Fang to become the leader of the Liberal Party.

He is also a member of the Advisory Committee on Textile & Clothing Industries, a director of the Chinese Manufacturers' Association of Hong Kong and a director of Hong Kong Brand Development Council. He was also a member of the 9th Guangdong Provincial Committee of the Chinese People's Political Consultative Conference in 1998. He has also been member of the Election Committee since 2006.

References

External links
 Members' Biographies Hon CHUNG Kwok-pan
 Liberal Party official website – Hon Felix CHUNG Kwok-pan 

1963 births
Living people
Liberal Party (Hong Kong) politicians
Hong Kong textiles industry businesspeople
HK LegCo Members 2012–2016
HK LegCo Members 2016–2021
Members of the Election Committee of Hong Kong, 2007–2012
Members of the Election Committee of Hong Kong, 2012–2017
Alumni of Robert Gordon University
Alumni of the University of Stirling